Chilean-Greek relations link Chile and Greece. Since 1992 Greece has had an embassy in  Santiago, along with 2 honorary consulates in Antofagasta and Valparaíso. Chile has an embassy in Athens and honorary consulates in Piraeus, Thessaloniki, Crete and Kalamata.

List of bilateral visits
 In June 2003, the Speaker of the Chilean Chamber of Deputies, Isabel Allende, visited Athens.
 In October 2003, the Greek Foreign Minister George Papandreou visited Santiago.
 In 2004, the then Chilean Defense Minister and future President of Chile Michelle Bachelet visited Athens.

List of bilateral treaties and agreements
 Cultural Agreement: Signed in Athens on May 14, 1962
 Tourist Agreement: Signed in Santiago on September 15, 1994.
 Framework agreement on economic, scientific and technological cooperation. Signed in Santiago on September 15, 1994
 Protocol for Consultations between Foreign Ministries. Signed in Athens on July 10, 1996.
 Agreement to abolish visas for diplomatic, government service, and official passports. Signed in Athens on July 10, 1996.
 Agreement for the promotion and mutual protection of investments. Signed on July 10, 1996.

See also
Foreign relations of Chile
Foreign relations of Greece
Greeks in Chile

References

External links 
  Chilean Ministry of External Relations about relations with Greece 
  Chilean embassy in Athens
 Greek Ministry of Foreign Affairs about the relation with Chile
 Greek embassy in Santiago 

 
Greece
Chile